Mount Daniel is the highest summit on the Cascade Range crest of Alpine Lakes Wilderness of the central Washington, USA.  It is the highest point in King and Kittitas counties. Streams on its eastern slopes form the headwaters of the Cle Elum River.

Geology 
Mount Daniel's volcanic rock is composed of andesite, dacite, and rhyolite inflows, breccia, and tuff. Volcanic sandstone is interbedded. Just west of Mount Daniel is the Mount Hinman plutonic stock.

Peaks 
From most vantages Mount Daniel appears to be a triple-crowned mass, but five summits can be identified.

 West Summit
 Middle Summit
 East Peak
 West Pyramid
 Northwest Summit

These elevations are based on Sea Level Datum of 1929 and are taken from the Mount Daniels 7.5 minute topographic map which was published in 1965. The United States Board on Geographic Names has assigned the name Mount Daniel to the east peak even though it is not the highest.

Glaciers 

Mount Daniel supports several glaciers, the largest of which is Lynch Glacier on the northwest slope of the mountain. The West Lynch Glacier hangs from the north slope of the Northwest Peak of Mount Daniel. West Lynch Glacier was formerly connected to Lynch Glacier. On the north side of the ridge between the Middle Summit and East Peak is another glacier with the tentative name of Daniel Glacier. It is partially connected to Lynch Glacier. Daniel Glacier is losing mass and was once much larger. Several small remnants, now just perennial snow accumulations rather than living glaciers, are located east of Daniel Glacier. On the southeast side of Mount Daniel, nested against a cirque headwall, is the Hyas Creek Glacier, an isolated and small ice mass that was once much larger. It drains to Hyas Creek and Peggy's Pond. All the glaciers on Mount Daniel are thinning and becoming stagnant. West Lynch Glacier is expected to disappear in the near future.

History 
The first known ascent of Mount Daniel was by The Mountaineers 1925 outing, but it is likely that surveyors had already ascended Daniel. The 1925 party climbed via Lynch Glacier.

Climbing Route 
The standard route to the summit starts at Salmon La Sac, passes Cathedral Rock, Peggy's Pond, and then is a scramble up to summit.

See also 
 List of mountains of the United States
 List of mountains by elevation

References

External links 

 
 

Cascade Range
Mountains of King County, Washington
Mountains of Kittitas County, Washington
Mountains of Washington (state)
Oligocene volcanism